Brady Browne (born April 24, 1983) is a former professional Canadian football defensive back. He  last played for the Winnipeg Blue Bombers of the Canadian Football League. He was drafted by the BC Lions in the fifth round of the 2008 CFL Draft. He played CIS football for the Manitoba Bisons.

Browne was also a member of the Saskatchewan Roughriders.

External links
Saskatchewan Roughriders bio

1983 births
Living people
Sportspeople from Burnaby
Players of Canadian football from British Columbia
Canadian football defensive backs
Manitoba Bisons football players
BC Lions players
Saskatchewan Roughriders players
Winnipeg Blue Bombers players